Hallard is a surname. Notable people with the surname include:

 C. M. Hallard (1865–1942), Scottish actor
 Frederick Hallard (1821-1882), Scottish advocate and legal author
 Ian Hallard (born 1974), English actor
 Nick Hallard (born 1975), English artist
 Philip Purser-Hallard (born 1971), British science fiction author 
 Steven Hallard (born 1965), British Olympic archer

Given name
 Hallard White (1929–2016), New Zealand rugby player

Other uses
 Purser-Hallard